Grant Community High School is a public high school established in 1930 and located in Fox Lake, Illinois, United States.

Notable alumni
 Daniel Dennis - 2016 Olympic wrestler
 Shane Webb - baseball player

References

External links
Grant Community High School Athletics

Public high schools in Illinois
Schools in Lake County, Illinois
1930 establishments in Illinois